Journey Through China is a 2015 French drama film directed by Zoltan Mayer. For her starring role, Yolande Moreau was nominated for Best Actress at the 6th Magritte Awards.

Plot
Liliane goes in China for the first time in her life to repatriate the body of her son, who died in an accident. Immersed in this culture so long ago, this trip marked by mourning becomes a journey of initiation.

Cast

 Yolande Moreau as Liliane Rousseau
 Jingjing Qu as Danjie
 Dong Fu Lin as Chao
 Ling Zi Liu as Li Shu Lan
 Qing Dong as Ruo Yu
 Yilin Yang as Yun
 André Wilms as Richard Rousseau
 Chenwei Li as Master Sanchen
 Sophie Chen as Mademoiselle Yang

Production
The movie was shot in China.

References

External links

2015 films
French drama films
2010s French-language films
2015 drama films
2010s French films